Julie Carr (born 1966) is an American poet who was awarded a 2011 National Endowment for the Arts Fellowship for Poetry.

She graduated from Barnard College with a BA in 1988, from New York University with an MFA in 1997, and from University of California, Berkeley with a Ph.D. in 2006.
She teaches at University of Colorado.

Her work has appeared in Volt, Verse, New American Writing, Parthenon West, Boston Review, Verse, Bombay Gin, Denver Quarterly, Colorado Review, American Letters and Commentary, and Public Space.

She is co-publisher of Counterpath Press.

Awards
2009 National Poetry Series
2009 Ahsahta Press Sawtooth Poetry Prize
2011 National Endowment for the Arts Fellowship for Poetry.

Works
"house/boat", Boston Review, April/May 2002  
"from Voc Ed", Tarpaulin Sky Fall Winter 2005
Mead: An Epithalamion. University of Georgia Press, 2004, 
Equivocal. Alice James Books, 2007, 
Sarah—of Fragments and Lines. Coffee House Press, 2010, 
100 Notes on Violence. Ahsahta Press, 2010, 
Contributed to The &NOW Awards 2: The Best Innovative Writing.  &NOW Books, 2013.
Someone Shot My Book.  University of Michigan Press, 2018,

Anthologies
"marriage", The Best American Poetry 2007 Simon and Schuster, 2007, 
Not for Mothers Only: Contemporary Poems on Child-Getting and Child-Rearing, Fence Books, 2007,

Reviews
In her first book, Mead: an Epithalamion (2004), Julie Carr employed marriage as both a theme and as the starting point for her poetic inquiries into relation and interconnection. Her second book, Equivocal (2007), goes a step farther in its scope, exploring specifically the roles and bonds of mother and child, and of child-becoming-mother, as well as opening into questions of family, history, and identity. In this investigation, Carr seeks to confront issues of an individual’s responsibility to others, whether they be a child, parent, spouse, or the world itself.

References

External links
"Julie Carr", PennSound
"Julie Carr: 100 Notes on Violence", Culture Industry, Mark Scroggins, April 12, 2010

21st-century American poets
American women poets
Barnard College alumni
Living people
New York University alumni
University of California, Berkeley alumni
University of Colorado faculty
21st-century American women writers
American women academics
1966 births